Miss America 2010, the 83rd Miss America pageant, was held on the Las Vegas Strip in Paradise, Nevada at the Theatre for the Performing Arts of Planet Hollywood Resort and Casino on Saturday, January 30, 2010. Miss America 2009, Katie Stam from Indiana, crowned her successor, Caressa Cameron from Virginia, at the end of the event.

Contestants from all 50 states along with District of Columbia, Virgin Islands and Puerto Rico competed for the prestigious title. The pageant was broadcast live on TLC. This edition was the 5th year that Las Vegas hosted the pageant.

Fifteen contestants were selected as finalists. After competing in swimsuit, the judges selected the top 12, and three are eliminated. After competing evening gown, ten were selected to compete in talent, and two are eliminated. Then, three are eliminated and seven were selected prior to the final interview. At the end of the competition, the four runners-up were announced first, followed by the new Miss America winner.

Results

Placements

* - Selected by America's vote from the Miss America pre-pageant special, Miss America: Behind the Curtain.

** - For the first time in pageant history, after 14 finalists were selected, contestant was voted by her fellow competitors as the 15th finalist among the remaining 39 non-finalists.

Order of announcements

Top 15

Top 12

Top 10

Top 7

Awards

Preliminary awards

Quality of Life award

Other awards

Judges
The seven judges for the competition were:
 actress and producer, Vivica A. Fox
 Miss America 2002, Katie Harman
 Olympic gymnast, Shawn Johnson
 musician, Dave Koz
 radio personality, Rush Limbaugh
 comedian and actor, Paul Rodriguez
 musician, Brooke White

Contestants

References

External links
 Miss America official website
 Miss America 2010 Winner Is Caressa Cameron

2010
2010 in the United States
2010 beauty pageants
2010 in Nevada
Zappos Theater
January 2010 events in the United States